Deidra Muriel Roper (born August 3, 1970), known professionally as DJ Spinderella or simply Spinderella, is an American DJ, rapper and producer. She is best known as a member of the hip-hop group Salt-N-Pepa. Roper occasionally appeared in The Salt-n-Pepa Show, a reality TV series focusing on reforming the group and which aired on the VH1 network in 2008.

Early life 
Deidra Muriel Roper was born August 3, 1970, and raised in Brooklyn, New York City, as one of five children. Her early influence in music began as a child, fascinated by her father's record collection growing up. Roper began her career as a DJ at age 14. During her sophomore year in high school, she began dating a local DJ who she learned DJ techniques from. Shortly thereafter, she began marketing herself as a DJ in the area around Brooklyn. At age 16, Roper was approached in school by a classmate who asked her would she be interested in joining an all-female rap group. The classmate knew Hurby "LuvBug" Azor, the producer of the group, and arranged for Roper to audition for him.

Career 
Roper was introduced to Salt-N-Pepa producer Hurby Azor just before the group was due to appear at the Westchester Music Festival in 1986. The group's original DJ, Latoya Hanson, had missed several rehearsals and group appearances, and the group was looking for a replacement. Future radio and TV personality Wendy Williams had also auditioned as the DJ. Roper was selected as the group's DJ by Azor (taking the name Spinderella) around the time the group's first album was being released. Since she was 16 at the time of joining, her parents had to give permission for her to travel around the country. The trio became one of the most successful female hip-hop acts of all time. They released five studio albums and saw several platinum and gold singles. Spinderella has produced several songs on the group's albums as well. In 1993, she was featured as a rapper on Big Daddy Kane's album Looks Like a Job For... on the second single, "Very Special", which would go on to become Big Daddy Kane's only top 40 hit. Salt-N-Pepa disbanded in 2002, then reformed in 2007 – eventually firing Spinderella in 2019.

From 2003 to 2006, Spinderella worked as a radio personality on the now-defunct KKBT 100.3 in Los Angeles, co-hosting The BackSpin, a nationally syndicated weekly radio show featuring old school hip-hop. She appeared in several episodes of the VH1 series The Salt N Pepa Show. From September 2010 to March 2011, she did mid-days at KSOC-94.5 "K-Soul" in Dallas, Texas. Spinderella is part of the American Diabetes Association Celebrity Cabinet, a TV ONE UnSung Ambassador, supporter of Saving Our Daughters Mentoring Program, and founder of the Spinderella DJ Academy. She appeared briefly on VH1's first annual Hip Hop Honors in November 2004, with her group members, but they did not perform. All three members performed on the second Hip Hop Honors on September 22, 2005. This was the trio's first performance as Salt-N-Pepa since 1999. In 2007, she acted as DJ for The Comedy Central Roast of Flavor Flav. In October 2008, the group performed their hit singles "Shoop", "Push It", and "Whatta Man" at the 2008 BET Hip Hop Awards. When the group appeared on The Wendy Williams Show to perform "Push It" on December 18, 2015, host Wendy Williams tried her hand at DJ'ing before Spinderella came out to continue in the role. On May 3, 2019, Spinderella announced in an Instagram post that she had been "terminated" from Salt-N-Pepa as of January 2019, and had broken her silence after the band hadn't made a public announcement regarding their parting of ways.

Personal life 
In 1992, Spinderella appeared in the film Stay Tuned. The same year, she had her first and only child, a daughter named Christy, with NBA basketball player Kenny Anderson. In 1996, she appeared in the film Kazaam, which starred Shaquille O'Neal. She opened her own beauty salon on October 21, 1997, the same year that the group released their final album Brand New. After this album, she was to have released a solo album, but this never materialized as Red Ant, Salt-N-Pepa's record label, ceased operations. Her daughter Christy later appeared in an episode of My Super Sweet 16.

Notes

References

External links 

DJ Spinderella Interview NAMM Oral History Library (2017)

1970 births
American hip hop DJs
American hip hop musicians
Living people
Women DJs
People from Teaneck, New Jersey
20th-century American musicians
21st-century American musicians
20th-century American women musicians
21st-century American women musicians
African-American women musicians
20th-century African-American women
20th-century African-American people
20th-century African-American musicians
21st-century African-American women
21st-century African-American musicians